"Easier" is a song by Australian pop rock band 5 Seconds of Summer. The song was released on 23 May 2019 through Interscope Records, as the lead single from their fourth studio album Calm (2020). It is their first release through the label. Billboard magazine included the song on their 100 Best Songs of 2019 list at number 79. At the 2019 ARIA Music Awards, the song earned them a nomination for the ARIA Award for Best Group.

Besides the original version, the band has also released an alternate version and two remixes of the song; on 5 July 2019, a version called "Easier – Live from the Vault" was released on YouTube with an accompanying music video. It was later made available on streaming services and for digital download as well. On 12 July 2019, a remix by Seeb was released, and on 13 August 2019, a remix with Charlie Puth was released.

Promotion
5 Seconds of Summer posted clips on social media leading up to the announcement, posting teasers from the song's upcoming music video along with its name and release date.

Composition 
Rolling Stone described the song as "dark" and noted the inspiration from "synth-heavy groups of the Eighties and Nineties like Depeche Mode and Tears for Fears and, more specifically, Nine Inch Nails' "Closer". Billboard noted that "the relatably heart-rending sentiment is elevated by lead singer Luke Hemmings' impassioned vocals, from the murmuring verses to the falsetto on the chorus".

Music video 
The music video was released the same day as the single, 23 May 2019. It was directed by Grant Singer. In the video, "Hemmings, wearing a leather ensemble and glitter eyeshadow, sings chained by the wrists to the roof of a blue-lit cave while guitarist Michael Clifford, bassist Calum Hood and drummer Ashton Irwin rock out in front of the candle-studded backdrop [...] In addition to the cave setting, the video also features a striking seductress and haunting scenes of the bandmates submerged in on orange-lit pool and individually strolling down a long hallway in which their headshots are set ablaze."

The blue lighting prominent throughout the video follows the aesthetic of the single's artwork. 4 symbols, representing each member, which were used in the teasers for the song, were also featured in the video as tattoos along the female dancer's spine as well as on a burning poster by the end.

As of March 2021, the video has over 55 million views.

Track listing

Awards and nominations

Charts

Weekly charts

Year-end charts

Certifications

Charlie Puth remix

A remix, which features American singer-songwriter Charlie Puth (who also co-wrote and produced the original version), was released on 13 August 2019.

Charts

Release history

Release history

References

2019 songs
2019 singles
Capitol Records singles
5 Seconds of Summer songs
Songs written by Louis Bell
Songs written by Charlie Puth
Songs written by Ryan Tedder
Songs written by Ali Tamposi
Songs written by Andrew Watt (record producer)
Song recordings produced by Louis Bell